The Hunchback of Notre Dame (sometimes known as simply Hunchback) is a 1982 American romantic drama TV film based on Victor Hugo's 1831 novel. Filming location was Pinewood Studios, England. It was directed by Michael Tuchner and Alan Hume and produced by Norman Rosemont and Malcolm J. Christopher. It starred Anthony Hopkins, Derek Jacobi, Lesley-Anne Down and John Gielgud. The film was produced as part of the long-running Hallmark Hall of Fame series and was televised on CBS on February 4, 1982.

Cast
Lesley-Anne Down as Esmeralda
Anthony Hopkins as Quasimodo
Derek Jacobi as Claude Frollo
David Suchet as Clopin Trouillefou
Gerry Sundquist as Pierre Gringoire
Tim Pigott-Smith as Phillipe
John Gielgud as Jacques Charmolue
Robert Powell as Captain Phoebus
Nigel Hawthorne as Magistrate at Esmeralda's trial
Roland Culver as Bishop of Paris
Rosalie Crutchley as Simone
David Kelly as Tavernkeeper
Joseph Blatchley as Albert
Dave Hill as Coppenhole
Donald Eccles as Judge
Timothy Bateson as Commerce
Jack Klaff as Officer
Timothy Morand as Maurice
Martin Carroll as Herald
Hugo de Vernier as Nobility
Eunice Black as Clergy
Kenny Baker as Pick Pocket
Michael Burrell as Clerical Aide
Antony Carrick as Auditor
John Kidd as 1st Physician
Stanley Lebor as Torturer
Norman Lumsden as King's Attorney
John Rutland as 2nd Old Man
Wally Thomas as 1st Old Man

External links

1982 films
1982 romantic drama films
Films based on The Hunchback of Notre-Dame
Films directed by Michael Tuchner
Hallmark Hall of Fame episodes
Films shot at Pinewood Studios
Films set in Paris
Films set in religious buildings and structures
Television series produced at Pinewood Studios
Films about Romani people
Films with screenplays by John Gay (screenwriter)
Films scored by Ken Thorne